Chignik Lake Airport  is a state-owned, public-use airport located at Chignik Lake, in the Lake and Peninsula Borough of the U.S. state of Alaska.

This airport is included in the FAA's National Plan of Integrated Airport Systems (2009–2013), which categorizes it as a general aviation facility. Scheduled airline service to King Salmon Airport is provided by Peninsula Airways (PenAir).

Airlines and destinations

Statistics

Facilities and aircraft 
Chignik Lake Airport has one runway designated 8/26 with a gravel surface measuring 2,800 by 60 feet (853 x 18 m). For the 12-month period ending July 31, 2005, the airport had 720 aircraft operations, an average of 60 per month: 69% air taxi and 31% general aviation. The airport is unattended.

See also 
 Chignik Airport 
 Chignik Bay Seaplane Base 
 Chignik Fisheries Airport 
 Chignik Lagoon Airport

References

External links 
 FAA Alaska airport diagram (GIF)

Airports in Lake and Peninsula Borough, Alaska